
The following lists events that happened during 1827 in South Africa.

Events
 A Wesleyan mission station is established north of the Great Kei River at present day Butterworth, Eastern Cape

References
See Years in South Africa for list of References

 
South Africa
Years in South Africa